Slaframine is an indolizidine alkaloidal mycotoxin that generally causes salivation (slobbers) in most animals. It is usually produced by the fungus Rhizoctonia leguminicola. It is a common fungal pathogen of red clover (Trifolium pratense) that causes black patch disease in the plant. Slaframine has the molecular formula C10H18N2O2. The different environmental condition promotes the growth of the Rhizoctonia leguminicola fungus. For example, wet and humid weather are the favorable environmental condition for the growth of the fungus and production of slaframine. Legume hays contaminated with slaframine causes slobber syndrome and the various animals are sensitive to its effects.

History
In the late 1940s and 1950s in Midwestern United States, various agricultural experiment stations revealed the outbreaks of salivation in the cattle. In 1956, the first case of fungal contamination of red clover with Rhizoctonia leguminicola was reported which was mainly associated with a pasture disease called black patch. This was so called because it derives its name from the appearance of affected areas in the field. Most of these cases were associated with the feeding of second-cutting red clover hay. Another serious outbreak of slobbers occurred in a herd of horses in the fall of 1979 near High Point, North Carolina. This was caused by a shipment of high-quality second-cutting red clover-orchard grass hay from a usual supplier in West Virginia. In 2010, the slaframine toxin, or "slobber toxin" was also observed in Central Kentucky because of the wet spring weather and abundant clover growth.

Metabolism
Liver is the major site of slaframine metabolism where it has been suggested that slaframine is metabolized in the liver by a microsomal flavoprotein oxidase to the ketoimine metabolite consisting of quaternary nitrogen separated from an acetate ester by two carbon atoms.

It is apparent to reveal that the more direct access to hepatic tissues provided by the route of administration, the shorter the time interval to the onset of salivation.

Toxicity

In horses, excessive salivation is usually the first sign of slaframine exposure. Signs typically develop within hours of exposure. The Slaframine poisoning or slobbers likely occur in a cooler and wetter spring or fall because these seasons are ideal for the growth of the fungus Rhizoctonia leguminicola. The other clinical signs associated with the "slobbers syndrome" include salivation, lacrimation, feed refusal, bloating, stiff joints, diarrhea, and weight loss. 

The clinical signs of slaframine toxicity are similar in all species. When animals are fed with slaframine contaminated forage then they salivate profusely. The experiment shows that a single dose of slaframine produces salivation for 6–10 hours. However, clinically affected animals can slobber for several days because they are fed with continued slaframine contaminated forages. Various other animals like sheep, swine, and guinea pigs were also found to suffer from Cyanosis and open-mouth breathing under experimental conditions in sheep, swine, and guinea pigs. Pigs were also observed to vomit, became dyspneic, and collapse with stiffened pelvic limbs.

Diagnosis and treatment
Generally, diagnosis of slaframine toxicity is done by observation of clinical signs (salivation) in animals consuming legume forage, particularly red clover hay. Further tests such as isolating in cultures can be done to identify the fungus Rhizoctonia leguminicola in the hay.  Although chemical analysis for slaframine is not usually necessary, chromatographic methods for detecting the toxin in hay, plasma, or milk have been described. Slowly, the slobber symptoms recover when the contaminated hay is removed, however clinical signs may persist for 1–2 days following removal of the toxic forage. In severe cases, atropine may be of benefit that helps in reversing the parasympathomimetic effects of slaframine, however it is unlikely to be completely resolving clinical signs.

References 

Alkaloids
Mycotoxins
Acetate esters